Dan Wolgamott (born October 24, 1990) is an American politician serving in the Minnesota House of Representatives since 2019. A member of the Minnesota Democratic–Farmer–Labor Party (DFL), Wolgamott represents District 14B in central Minnesota, which includes the city of St. Cloud and parts of Benton, Sherburne, and Stearns Counties.

Early life, education, and career
Wolgamott attended Saint John's University, graduating with a Bachelor of Arts in political science. He was an intern in U.S. Representative Tim Walz's office.

Minnesota House of Representatives
Wolgamott ran for the Minnesota Senate in District 14 in 2016, losing to Republican Jerry Relph by 141 votes. He was elected to the Minnesota House of Representatives in 2018 and has been reelected every two years since.

In 2021-22, Wolgamott was an assistant majority leader for the Democratic-Farmer-Labor Party House Caucus. He was sworn in as speaker pro tempore of the House on January 3, 2023. Wolgamott is the vice chair of the Higher Education Finance and Policy Committee and sits on the Capital Investment, Labor and Industry Finance and Policy, and Rules and Legislative Administration Committees.

Electoral history

Personal life
Wolgamott has two children. He resides in St. Cloud, Minnesota.

References

External links

 Official House of Representatives website
 Official campaign website

1990 births
21st-century American politicians
Businesspeople from Minnesota
College of Saint Benedict and Saint John's University alumni
Democratic Party members of the Minnesota House of Representatives
Living people
Politicians from St. Cloud, Minnesota